Six ships of the Royal Navy have been named HMS Tyne, after the River Tyne, England:
  was a 28-gun  launched in 1814 and sold in 1825. She made one notable capture of a pirate vessel. She became a whaler for Daniel Bennett & Sons, but was lost in early 1827 on her first voyage to the British southern whale fishery.
  was a 28-gun sixth rate launched in 1826, converted to a storeship in 1848, and sold in 1862 for breaking up.
 HMS Tyne was launched in 1845 as the 36-gun fifth-rate . She became a Royal Naval Reserve training ship in 1863, was renamed Tyne in July 1867, and then Durham in November the same year. She was sold in 1908.
 , launched in 1878 as SS Mariotis, was a troop ship. She foundered in a gale off Sheerness in 1920 while awaiting disposal.
  was a  launched in 1940. She served in World War II and the Korean War, and was scrapped in 1972.
  is a  launched in 2002 and currently in service.

Battle honours
 Baltic 1854
 Korea 1953

References
 

Royal Navy ship names